Anatol Petrencu (born 22 May 1954, Căuşeni) is a politician, historian and academic from the Republic of Moldova. In 1990-1992 he was the dean of the Faculty of History of the State University of Moldova, and between 1998 and 2006 he was president of the Association of Historians of Moldova. Between 2006 and 2010 he was the president of the European Action Movement party. Since October 2010 he has been the director of the Institute of Social History "ProMemoria". Vice President of the Liberal Party.

Biography 

Anatol Petrencu, the PhD in historical sciences, university professor, was born on 22 May 1954 in Căuşeni. He carried out his compulsory military service in the Soviet army (1972–1974). He graduated from Moldova State University in 1980 and between 1982 and 1985 he studied at Moscow State Institute of International Relations. He has been working for Moldova State University since 1985. He did doctoral studies at the Institute of International Economic and Political Research of the Academy of Sciences of the Russian Federation. In 1986 he passed his Masters' thesis with the theme "Romanian-Italian relations in the 70s - the first half of the 80s", and in 1998 he became a  PhD in historical sciences with the work "Romania's Policy on Bessarabia, 1940-1944". In 1990-1992 he was the dean of the Faculty of History of the MSU, and between 1998 -2006 he was president of the Association of Historians of Moldova. Between 2006 and 2010 he was the president of the  European Action Movement. Anatol Petrencu is a member of the Commission for the Study of the Communist Dictatorship in Moldova. Since October 2010 he has been the director of the Institute of Social History "ProMemoria".

In March 2011 the European Action Movement party merged with the Liberal Party.

Publications

Monographs 
 The historical education in Romania (1948-1989), Chișinău, Știința Publishing House, 1991, 112 p.
 Romanian-Italian relations: from confrontation to collaboration. 1945-1985, Chișinău, Universitas Publishing House, 1993, 216 p.
 Bessarabia in the Second World War: 1940-1944, Chișinău, Luceum Publishing House, 1997, 346 p.
 Romania and Bessarabia in the Second World War, Chișinău, Epigraf Publishing House, 1999, 176 p.
 The Poles in the Second World War. Political History, Chișinău, Cartdidact Publishing House, 2005, 246 p .; 2nd edition, Anastatic, Iași, Tipo Moldova Publishing House, 2010.
 Bessarabia during the Second World War: 1939-1945, Chișinău, Prut International Publishing House, 2006, 224 p .; 2nd edition, Anastatic, Iasi, Tipo Moldova Publishing House, 2010.
 Warsaw seen by a Bessarabian historian, Chișinău, Cartdidact Publishing House, 2006, 144 p.

Collections of articles 
 In the service of the goddess Clio, Chișinău, the editorial-polygraphic company Typography Central, 2001, 816 p.
 Contemporary history: studies, materials, attitudes, Chișinău, Cartdidact Publishing House, 2011, 580 p.

Document collections 
 Chrestomation to the History of Romanians. 1917-1992 (in collaboration), Chisinau, Universitas Publishing House, 1993, 295 p.
 In defense of national history and dignity. Collection of documents (in collaboration), Chisinau, Cartdidact Publishing House, 2003, 96 p.
 The Poles in the Second World War. Document collection, Chisinau, Cartdidact Publishing House, 2004, 240 pages; 2nd edition, Anastatic, Iasi, Tipo Moldova Publishing House, 2010.
 Marshal Ion Antonescu and Bessarabia. 1941-1944. Collection of documents (in collaboration), Iași, Demiurg Publishing House, 2008, 350 p.

University textbooks  

 Universal history. Contemporary Age, 1939-1993 (Europe, USA, Canada), lectures, Chișinău, Știința Publishing House, 1995, 272 p.
 Universal history. Contemporary Era, 1939-1995 (Europe, USA, Canada), lectures, Second Edition completed, Chișinău, Muzeum Publishing House, 1995, 346 p.
 Universal history. Contemporary Era, 1939-1996 (Europe, USA, Canada), lectures, 3rd edition completed, Chișinău, Muzeum Publishing House, 1995, 346 p .; 4th edition, Anastatic, Iasi, Tipo Moldova Publishing House, 2010.

Bibliography
 Profesorul şi istoricul Anatol Petrencu 50 de ani (Le professeur et historien Anatol Petrencu a 50 ans). In: Cugetul, 2004, 2, p. 75-76.

References

External links 
 Preşedintele interimar al Republicii Moldova Mihai Ghimpu a emis un decret prezidenţial privind constituirea Comisiei pentru studierea şi aprecierea regimului comunist totalitar din Republica Moldova.
Anatol Petrencu
Hundreds of thousands of cases to be examined by commission for combating Communism 
 http://www.privesc.eu/?p=1884 - The first press conference of the Commission, Moldpress, January 18, 2010. Video.
 https://web.archive.org/web/20100309165120/http://www.timpul.md/article/2010/01/18/5881 - interview with Gheorghe Cojocaru, president of the Commission.
 Vladimir Tismăneanu, Un moment istoric: Comisia de studiere a comunismului
 Site-ul Parlamentului Republicii Moldova
 http://anatolpetrencu.promemoria.md/
 Politica de deznaționalizare a românilor din Basarabia, în Revista ART-EMIS
 Interviu cu Anatol Petrencu, Radio România Actualități
 Interviu cu Anatol Petrencu, Ziarul de Gardă, Nr. 137 (5 iulie 2007)
 Anatol Petrencu în dialog cu Vladimir Bukovski, în Memorialul Victimelor Comunismului și al Rezistenței
 Deportările staliniste – crime împotriva umanității, Jurnal de Chisinau, nr. 294 din 2 iulie 2004 
 Simboluri comuniste – afară cu ele!
 Toponimia bolșevică, ce facem cu ea? (Partea I)
 Toponimia bolșevică, ce facem cu ea? (Partea a II-a)
 Totalitarismul sovietic: studierea fenomenului. Contribuții (1)
 Totalitarismul sovietic: studierea fenomenului. Lustrația la vedere. Contribuții (2)

1954 births
Living people
Moldova State University alumni
20th-century Moldovan historians
Members of the Commission for the Study of the Communist Dictatorship in Moldova
Moscow State Institute of International Relations alumni
Save Bessarabia Union politicians
21st-century Moldovan historians